Korney Andreyevich Shperling (born 7 June 1947) is a retired Russian football coach.

External links
 Profile by footballfacts.ru

1947 births
Living people
Soviet football managers
FC Ural Yekaterinburg managers
Russian football managers
FC Baltika Kaliningrad managers
FC Volgar Astrakhan managers
FC Dynamo Stavropol managers